George Allen Brown (May 17, 1912 – January 23, 1972) was a Canadian ice hockey centre who played 79 games in the National Hockey League with the Montreal Canadiens between 1937 and 1939. The rest of his career, which lasted from 1932 to 1943, was spent in minor leagues. He was born in Winnipeg, Manitoba.

Playing career
Brown began his hockey career with the Montreal Canadiens in the 1936–37 NHL season playing 27 games (4–6–10) during the regular season then four playoff games in which he went pointless. The following season, he split his time between Montreal and the IAHL New Haven Eagles. That season he was again held pointless during the playoffs. He played his final season with Montreal before going back to the IAHL for the rest of his playing career where he played for the Eagles again followed by the Springfield Indians and the Hershey Bears.

Career statistics

Regular season and playoffs

Awards and achievements
 Memorial Cup Championship (1931)
 MCHL Scoring Champion (1936)

External links

1912 births
1972 deaths
Canadian ice hockey centres
Elmwood Millionaires players
Hershey Bears players
Ice hockey people from Winnipeg
Montreal Canadiens players
New Haven Eagles players
Springfield Indians players
Syracuse Stars (AHL) players
Winnipeg Monarchs players